Berkshire Partners is an American private equity firm based in Boston. It has invested in over 100 middle market companies since 1986 through nine investment funds with aggregate capital commitments of more than $16 billion. Berkshire has developed specific industry experience in several areas including consumer products and retail, business services, communications, industrials and healthcare. The firm has invested over $50 million to $500 million of equity capital in each portfolio company.

Berkshire Partners typically makes equity investments of $50 million to $500 million in companies with enterprise values between $100 million and $1.5 billion. The firm seeks to partner with management teams to help grow their businesses and create long-term value.

History
Berkshire Partners was founded by Bradley M. Bloom, J. Christopher Clifford, Carl Ferenbach, Richard K. Lubin and Russell L. Epker in 1984. The firm traces its roots back to Boston's Thomas H. Lee Partners, a large-cap private equity firm founded a decade earlier. Since its founding in 1984, Berkshire has raised nine private equity funds with total investor commitments of more than $16.0 billion since inception.

Berkshire Fund I (1984) – $59 million
Berkshire Fund II (1986) – $125 million
Berkshire Fund III (1992) – $168 million
Berkshire Fund IV (1996) – $387 million
Berkshire Fund V (1998) – $985 million
Berkshire Fund VI (2002) – $1.7 billion
Berkshire Fund VII (2006) – $3.1 billion
Berkshire Fund VIII (2011) – $4.5 billion
Berkshire Fund IX (2016) – $5.5 billion

Portfolio
Since its inception in 1984, Berkshire Partners has invested in over 100 companies and developed specific industry experience in several areas including consumer products and retail, business services, communications, industrials and healthcare.

References

External links

Private equity firms of the United States
Companies based in Boston
American companies established in 1984